Deepti Bhatnagar (born 30 September 1967) is a former Indian actress and model who worked predominantly in Hindi films, in addition to Telugu films. Her first film role came in Sanjay Gupta's Ram Shastra. She has also appeared in the Telugu film, Pelli Sandadi, the American film, Inferno and the Bollywood film, Mann.

Early life
Bhatnagar was born in Meerut, Uttar Pradesh. She Went to school in Delhi and attended Meerut University. She moved to Mumbai in 1992 to identify a good ad agency to promote her handicrafts factory in Meerut, Uttar Pradesh.

Career
In 1992, Bhatnagar was promoting her handicrafts in Mumbai, when she got an opportunity to sign for an ad agency to model for the Roopmilan saris' press ad and after that ad she signed 12 more campaigns. She had given up her interest in running the handicraft factory and entered into the professional modeling world. She won the Eves Weekly contest in 1990. Soon afterwards, she was modeling in Singapore for various international fashion shows.

Television

In 1998, Bhatnagar appeared in a television show Yeh Hai Raaz, replacing Ruby Bhatia in the lead role of a tough cop.

In 2001, she ventured into television production with the travel shows Yatra, a religious travel guide show and Musafir Hoon Yaaron, an around the world travel guide show, both aired on StarPlus. She also hosted both the shows.

She also produced a TV serial Kabhi Aaye Na Judaai in 2003-04 on Star plus.

Personal life
Bhatnagar is married to Randeep Arya, the director of her show, Musafir Hoon Yaron. Together they have two sons.

Filmography

Film

Music videos

See also

 List of Hindi film actresses

References

External links

 
 
 
 

1967 births
Actresses in Hindi cinema
Actresses in Tamil cinema
20th-century Indian actresses
Female models from Uttar Pradesh
Living people
Chaudhary Charan Singh University alumni
People from Meerut
Actresses from Uttar Pradesh
21st-century Indian actresses
Actresses in Kannada cinema
Indian film actresses
Actresses in Telugu cinema
Actresses in Malayalam cinema